The 2017 Serena Williams tennis season officially began on 5 January with the start of the 2017 ASB Classic. Williams entered the season as the number two ranked player.

On January 28, 2017, Williams set a record for the most slams in the Open Era when she claimed her 23rd slam at the 2017 Australian Open. On April 19, she announced that she was pregnant with her first child and would not participate in any further tournaments for the rest of the year.

Singles matches

Tournament schedule

Singles schedule

Williams' 2017 singles tournament schedule is as follows:

Yearly records

Head-to-head matchups
Ordered by percentage of wins

  Belinda Bencic 1–0
  Nicole Gibbs 1–0
  Johanna Konta 1–0
  Mirjana Lučić-Baroni 1–0
  Pauline Parmentier 1–0
  Lucie Šafářová 1–0
  Barbora Strýcová 1–0
  Venus Williams 1–0
  Madison Brengle 0–1

Finals

Singles

Earnings

See also
 2017 WTA Tour
 Serena Williams career statistics

References

Serena Williams tennis seasons
Williams tennis season
Serena Williams tennis season